The men's long jump competition at the 2018 Asian Games took place on 25 and 26 August 2018 at the Gelora Bung Karno Stadium.

Schedule
All times are Western Indonesia Time (UTC+07:00)

Records

Results
Legend
DNS — Did not start

Qualification
 Qualification: Qualifying performance 7.80 (Q) or at least 12 best performers (q) advance to the final.

Final

References

External links
Results

Men's long jump
2018